Coenagrionoidea is a superfamily of closed wing damselflies of the order Odonata found worldwide. It contains 3 different families.

See also 
 List of damselflies of the world (Coenagrionidae)

References

 
Taxa named by William Forsell Kirby
Insect superfamilies